Shanti Enathu Shanti is a 1991 Indian Tamil language film, written, directed and produced by T. Rajendar. He also stars with Telugu actor Ramesh Babu Ghattamaneni (elder brother to Mahesh Babu) and Neetha Puri. The film was released on 18 April 1991. Silambarasan won Best Child artiste award at the 12th Cinema Express Awards.

Cast 
T. Rajendar
Radha (cameo appearance)
Ramesh (voice dubbed by Achamillai Gopi)
Neetha Puri
Vennira Aadai Moorthy
Disco Shanti
Silambarasan
Chakravarthy (voice dubbed by Nassar)
Ali
Y. Vijaya

Soundtrack 
Soundtrack was composed by T. Rajendar, who also wrote the lyrics.
"Idhalgal Urasum" – Mano
"Poomele Kadhal" – Mano
"En Uyirin Uyire" – Mano
"Onnu Rendu" – S. Janaki
"Sundhariyin Raangi" – Mano
"Ye Raasa" – S. Janaki
"Ponna Follow" – Mano
"Kadhal Illai" – Mano

References

External links 
 

1990s Tamil-language films
1991 films
Films directed by T. Rajendar
Films scored by T. Rajendar
Films with screenplays by T. Rajendar